Blade and Sorcery is a medieval fantasy simulation sandbox game developed and published by French independent studio WarpFrog, made exclusively for virtual reality. Combat and environmental interactions are driven by full physics simulation. The game released in early access in 2018.

Development 
Blade and Sorcery started development in 2016 as a multiplayer project in Unity called "Sorcering"; a teleport-only game where the player fought waves of the undead using magic. The developer, KospY, had previously worked on mods for Kerbal Space Program and Fallout 3 which helped him learn Unity and how to program. He chose to develop for VR out of an interest in the emerging technology and the prospects VR allowed in innovation for more experimental games. This led to the decision of making a game that was a full physics simulation sandbox first and foremost, the first of its kind in VR. The decision to add melee combat came afterwards, and grew organically when the physics simulation proved to be engaging and lend itself to innovative melee combat in VR.

The original multiplayer concept design for Sorcering was abandoned when it became evident that high lag with physics made it unsatisfying to fight human enemies, and the small VR user base made it hard to justify a multiplayer only VR game. After two years of creating the prototype, KospY left his job and started working full-time on the project which now became Blade and Sorcery. He used the extra time to rewrite the game's code from scratch, making the codebase easier to use and run faster. The new direction of the game would be a single-player game, focusing on melee and magic built on the physics simulation sandbox KospY had created. He later talked about the process, "It took me nearly 6 months, but I don’t regret any of it whatsoever; and Blade & Sorcery is now a good foundation to build upon it."

When asked about being a solo dev, he said the greatest challenge was not being able to focus on multiple things at once, instead having to work on one feature at a time. The visuals were inspired by games such as The Elder Scrolls V: Skyrim and Dark Messiah. Not being an artist, KospY originally used premade assets for the game and tried to choose ones that fit the game the best. As the WarpFrog team grew, piece by piece store-made assets were replaced with custom built ones, with the most dramatic graphical changes appearing at U8.

Early access updates have added new weapons and additional magic spells. As of U10, sandbox game mode also features "Dungeons"; a semi-procedurally generated dungeon crawl with prespawned enemies. Multiplayer could be added to the game at some point, but it's unclear if the feature will make the cut.

References 

Fantasy video games
HTC Vive games
Meta Quest games
Oculus Rift games
Single-player video games
Upcoming video games
Valve Index games
Virtual reality games
Windows games